The 2011 season is the 75th season of competitive football in Belarus.

National teams 

The home team or the team that is designated as the home team is listed in the left column; the away team is in the right column.

Senior

Friendly matches

UEFA Euro 2012 qualifying

Under-21

2011 UEFA European Under-21 Football Championship

2011 UEFA European Under-21 Football Championship qualification

Under-19

2011 UEFA European Under-19 Football Championship elite qualification

2012 UEFA European Under-19 Football Championship qualification

Under-17

2011 UEFA European Under-17 Football Championship elite qualification

2012 UEFA European Under-17 Football Championship qualification

League tables

Belarusian Premier League

Belarusian First League

Domestic cups

Belarusian Cup

Final

Belarusian Super Cup

Belarusian clubs in international competitions

FC BATE Borisov

FC Minsk

FC Shakhtyor Soligorsk

FC Gomel

References
 FIFA - Belarusian Association
 Belarus tables at Soccerway
 Belarus national team at Soccerway